Alexis Vega may refer to:

 Alexis Vega (footballer, born 1993), Argentine midfielder
 Alexis Vega (footballer, born 1997), Mexican forward